Mendeley is a reference manager software founded in 2007 by PhD students Paul Foeckler, Victor Henning, Jan Reichelt and acquired by Elsevier in 2013. It is used to manage and share research papers and generate bibliographies for scholarly articles.

History
The company Mendeley, named after the biologist Gregor Mendel and chemist Dmitri Mendeleev, was founded in London in November 2007 by three German PhD students. The first public beta version of the software was released in August 2008. The company's investors included some people previously involved with Last.fm, Skype, and Warner Music Group, as well as academicians from Cambridge and Johns Hopkins University.
In 2009, Mendeley won several awards including Plugg.eu "European Start-up of the Year 2009", TechCrunch Europas "Best Social Innovation Which Benefits Society 2009", and The Guardian ranked it #6 in "Top 100 tech media companies".

In 2012, Mendeley was one of the repositories for green Open Access recommended by Peter Suber. The recommendation was revoked after Elsevier bought Mendeley.

Mendeley was purchased by the academic publisher Elsevier in early 2013. The deal price was speculated to be €50 million (US$65 million). The sale led to debate on scientific networks and in the media interested in Open Access, and upset members of the scientific community who felt that the Mendeley's acquisition by Elsevier was antithetical to Mendeley's open sharing model.

David Dobbs, in The New Yorker, suggested Elsevier's reasons for buying Mendeley could have been to acquire its user data and/or to "destroy or co opt an open-science icon that threatens its business model."
This was contrasted to a non-profit service like Unpaywall, which marketed itself as not susceptible to a sell-out to Elsevier.

Products 
After the acquisition, the Mendeley team extended its product line while continuing to iterate on its core reference manager application (Mendeley Desktop).

On 23 September 2013, Mendeley announced iPhone and iPad apps. An Android app followed shortly after.

On 12 January 2015, Mendeley announced the acquisition of Newsflo, a service which provided links to press coverage of researchers' work. The functionality was subsequently incorporated into Mendeley Feed and Mendeley Profile.

In April 2016, Mendeley Data, a platform for sharing citable research datasets online, was promoted out of beta.

In October 2016, Mendeley Careers was launched. The service is intended help researchers locate job opportunities. 

On 24 May 2019, Elsevier announced two new products: Mendeley Reference Manager and Mendeley Cite.

On March 15 2021, the Mendeley mobile app was removed from the Apple App Store and Google Play, leaving access via the web site or Mendeley Reference Manager on the desktop the only way to access the services. The literature search function in the desktop application had also been removed.

In September 2022, Elsevier discontinued the downloads of Mendeley Desktop as part of a transition to the new web-based solution (Mendeley Reference Manager). The company plans to permanently stop the signs-in to Mendeley Desktop in a longer term.

Features
The software can track reader counts, a readership statistic which has been asserted to predict citation impact, whereas journal-level metrics are poor predictors of reliability. An automatic metadata extraction from PDF files is also available. The platform can integrate with Microsoft Word, OpenOffice and other platforms. The platform intends to be copyright-compliant by allowing users to share files in private groups.

Incidents 
In 2018, an update to Mendeley resulted in some users losing PDFs and annotations stored in their accounts. Elsevier fixed the issue for most users after a number of weeks.

See also
 Comparison of reference management software
 Metadata discovery
 Citation Style Language
 List of academic databases and search engines

Notes and references

External links
 

Reference management software
Software that uses Qt
Windows software
2013 mergers and acquisitions
RELX